Governor Lucas may refer to:

Frank Lucas (Wyoming politician) (1876–1948), 13th Governor of Wyoming
Gervase Lucas (1611–1667), Governor of Bombay from 1666 to 1667
Robert Lucas (governor) (1781–1853), 12th Governor of Ohio and 1st Governor of Iowa Territory